Zuzanna Czapska (born 4 August 1998) is a Polish alpine skier. She competed at the  2022 Winter Olympics, in Women's slalom, Women's giant slalom, and  Mixed team.

She competed at the Alpine skiing at the 2019 Winter Universiade, and 2021–22 FIS Alpine Ski World Cup.

References

External links 
 Zuzanna Czapska of Team Poland following her first run during the Women's Giant Slalom on day three of the Beijing 2022 Winter Olympic Games Photo by Julian Finney

1998 births
Living people
Alpine skiers at the 2022 Winter Olympics
Polish female alpine skiers
Olympic alpine skiers of Poland
Competitors at the 2023 Winter World University Games
21st-century Polish women